Eye of the Storm is the sixth extended play by American hip hop duo Insane Clown Posse. Physical copies can be obtained only on Hatchetgear, the official Psychopathic Records online webstore. It is the group's 24th overall release.

Track listing
All tracks produced by Mike E. Clark
 "Intro" — 0:24
 "The Madness" — 3:44
 "Yellow Bus" — 3:48
 "High Rise" — 4:42
 "The Perfect Night" — 3:41
 "Scatter Brain" — 3:05
 "Thrill of The Kill" — 4:32
 "Wind Me Up" — 4:49

2007 EPs
Albums produced by Mike E. Clark
Insane Clown Posse EPs
Psychopathic Records EPs